Hajjiabad (also Romanized as Ḩājjīābād) is a village in Tankaman Rural District, Tankaman District, Nazarabad County, Alborz Province, Iran. At the 2006 census, its population was 407, in 109 families.

References 

Populated places in Nazarabad County